Angel is the third single on Theory of a Deadman's fifth studio album Savages. The single was released on February 24, 2015.

Composition

"Angel" is a ballad about a man who's in love with an angel but realizes that he eventually has to let her go. Randy Shatkowski of Underground Pulse describes the song as an "electronic-tinged lost love ballad" and noted Tyler Connolly's vocals to be his most vulnerable yet.

Chart positions

Weekly charts

Year-end charts

Certifications

References 

2014 songs
2015 singles
Theory of a Deadman songs
Roadrunner Records singles
Songs written by Tyler Connolly
Song recordings produced by Howard Benson
Songs written by Jennifer Decilveo